Titus Uba (born 25 September 1965) is Nigerian politician who is currently serving as speaker of the Benue State House of Assembly since August 2018. Uba represents Kyan constituency in the state assembly. His emergence as the speaker of the house followed a vote of no confidence and the subsequent  impeachment of  the former speaker of the assembly, Terkimbi Ikyange. In 2019,  Uba was re-elected speaker for the 9th Benue State House of Assembly.

Education 
Uba is a native of Akehe, Ute, in Vandeikya Local Government Area of Benue State. His early education started at LGEA Primary  School in Akehe but later transferred to Demonstration Primary School, Makurdi where he finished with a First School Leaving Certificate in 1979. Uba studied at Saint Michael’s Secondary School, Aliade, finishing in 1984 with a General Certificate Examination (GCE). In 1987, Uba proceeded to Federal Polytechnic, Idah in Kogi State where he earned National Diploma in Mechanical Engineering in 1989. He obtained a Higher National Diploma (HND) in Mechanical Engineering from Federal Polytechnic, Bauchi in 2004.

References 

Living people
People from Benue State
Nigerian politicians
1965 births